DeLorenzo or De Lorenzo or de Lorenzo is an Italian surname. It may refer to:

Giovanni de Lorenzo Larciani (1484-1527), Italian painter

Bart DeLorenzo (born 1965), American theater director
Dana DeLorenzo (born 1983), American actress
Enrico de Lorenzo, Italian bobsledder who competed during the 1960s
Francesco De Lorenzo (born 1938), Italian doctor and politician
Italo de Lorenzo, Italian bobsledder who competed in the mid-1960s
Leonardo De Lorenzo (1875–1962), Italian musician
Michael DeLorenzo (born 1959), American actor
Tista De Lorenzo (born 1934), Australian football player
Victor DeLorenzo (born 1954), American musician
Jax DeLorenzo (born 2014)
Dog

See also
De Lorenzo's Tomato Pies, a pizzeria in New Jersey
Lorenzo (name)

Surnames
Italian-language surnames